A Hasidic dynasty is a dynasty led by Hasidic Jewish spiritual leaders known as rebbes, and usually has some or all of the following characteristics:
 Each leader of the dynasty is often known as an ADMOR (abbreviation for  ADoneinu MOreinu veRabeinu – "our master, our teacher, and our rabbi"), or simply as Rebbe (or "the Rebbe"), and at times called the "Rav" ("rabbi"), and sometimes referred to in English as a "Grand Rabbi";
 The dynasty continues beyond the initial leader's lifetime by succession (usually by a family descendant);
 The dynasty is usually named after a key town in Eastern Europe where the founder may have been born or lived, or where the group began to grow and flourish;
 The dynasty has (or once had) followers who, through time, continue following successive leaders (rebbes), or may even continue as a group without a leader by following the precepts of a deceased leader.

A Hasidic group has the following characteristics:
 It was founded by a leader who did not appoint or leave a successor;
 It may be named after a key town in Eastern Europe where the founder may have been born or lived, or where the group began to grow and flourish, or it may be named after the founder himself;
 It has followers who continue as a group under the direction of rabbis who expound and interpret the precepts of the deceased founder.

Dynasties with larger following
Hasidic dynasties (arranged alphabetically) with a large following include:

Dynasties with smaller following
Hasidic dynasties (arranged alphabetically) with a small following include:

Other dynasties
Many of these dynasties have presently few or no devotees, due to most of the Hasidic groups being destroyed during the Holocaust, 1939–1945. Other communities are flourishing, and have growing Hasidic sects. There are many dynasties whose followers number around five to fifteen people, and are not listed here.

A 
 Alesk (from Olesko, Ukraine)
 Amdur (from Indura, Belarus)
 Anipoli (from Annopol, Ukraine)
 Apta / Zinkov / Mezhbizh (from Opatów, Poland)

B 
 Beitsh (from Biecz, Poland)
 Bender (from Bender, Moldova)
 Berditchev (Levi Yitzchok of Berditchev (1740–1810) from Berdychiv, Ukraine)
 Bergsass Current Rebbe: Aaron Pollak, Founder: Abraham Alter Pollak (died 2007), Headquartered in: El'ad, Israel (from Beregszász, Hungary (now Ukraine))
 Bertch (from Bircza, Poland)
 Białystok (from Białystok)
 Bialobrzeg (from Białobrzegi, Poland)
 Bluzhev (from Błażowa, Poland)
 Bikovsk (from Bikofsk)
 Bohush (from Buhuși, Romania)
 Bonia
 Botoshan (from Botoşani, Romania)
 Brod (from Brody, Ukraine) (several)
 Brezahn (from Berezhany, Ukraine)
 Brizdovitz (from Berezdivtsi, Ukraine)
 Bucharest (from București, Romania) (several)
 Burshtin  (from Burshtyn, Ukraine)

C 
 Chabad-Avrutsh (from Ovruch, Ukraine)
 Chabad-Bobroisk (from Bobrujsk, Belarus)
 Chabad-Kapust
 Chabad-Liadi
 Chabad-Nezhin
 Chabad-Strashelye
 Chernovitz (from Chernivtsi) (several)
 Czortkow (from Chortkiv)
 Chust (from Khust) (several)
 Cleveland
 Cracow (from Kraków)

D 
 Deyzh (from Dés, Hungary) (today Romania)
 Dinov (from Dynów, Poland)
 Dombrova (from Dąbrowa Tarnowska, Poland)
 Drubitsh (from Drohobych, Poland) (several)
 Dzirka (from Györke, Hungary) (today Ďurkov, Slovakia)
 Dzikov (from Tarnobrzeg, Poland)

E 
 Erlau (from Eger/Erlau, Hungary)
 Etched (from Nagyecsed, Hungary)

F 
 Faltishan (from Fălticeni, Romania)

G 
 Gorlitz (from Gorlice, Poland)
 Gostynin (from Gostynin, Poland)
 Gvodzitz (from Hvizdets)
 Gribov (from Grybów, Poland)
 Galovitch (Hasidic dynasty)

H 
 Hornsteipel (from Hornostaypil', Ukraine)
 Huvniv (from Hivniv, Ukraine)
 Husiatyn ( from Husiatyn, Ukraine)

K 
 Kaliv (from Nagykálló, Hungary)
 Kaminke (the unrelated Ukrainian Kaminke dynasty from Kamianka, Ukraine and Galician Kaminke dynasty from Kamianka-Buzka, Ukraine)
 Kaminetz
 Kunskvola (from Końskowola, Poland)
 Karlihaz
 Kashau (from Kassa, Hungary)
 Kerestir (from Bodrogkeresztúr, Hungary)
 Khentshin (from Chęciny, Poland)
 Kielce (from Kielce, Poland)
 Koidanov (from Koidanava, Belarus)
 Kolbasov (Végaszó, Hungary)
 Komarno (from Komarno, Ukraine)
 Kopyczynitz (from Kopychyntsi, Ukraine)
 Korets (from Korets, Ukraine)
 Koson (from Mezőkaszony, Hungary)
 Kosov (from Kosiv, Ukraine)
 Kotsk (from Kock, Poland)
 Kozlov
 Kozhnitz (from Kozienice, Poland)
 Krasna
 Krula (from Nagykároly, Hungary)
 Kshanov (from Chrzanów, Poland)
 Kuzmir (from Kazimierz Dolny, near Warsaw) (several)

L 
 Łańcut (from Łańcut, Poland)
 Lashkovitz (from Ulashkivtsi, Ukraine)
 Lelov (from Lelów, Poland)
 Lechovitch (from Lyakhavichy, Belarus)
 Linitz (from Linitz)
 Liske (from Olaszliszka, Hungary)
 Lizhensk (from Leżajsk, Poland)
 Leva (from Leova, Moldova)
 Liozna (from Liozna, Belarus)
 Lublin (from Lublin, Poland) (several)
 Lutsk (from Lutsk, Ukraine) (several)

M 
 Margareten (from Margitta, Hungary) (today Marghita, Romania)
 Mattersdorf (from Mattersburg, Austria)
 Mezhbizh (from Medzhybizh), Ukraine; Also see Apter Rov
 Mishkoltz (from Miskolc, Hungary) (several)
 Mogelnitz (from Mogielnica, Poland)
 Manestrishtze (from Monastyryshche, Ukraine)

N 
 
 Narol (from Narol, Galicia/Austria-Hungary, now in Poland)
 Neshchiz (from Nesukhoyezhe, Ukraine)

O 
 Ostrof
 Ozherov (from Ożarów, Poland)

P 
 Pabianice (from Pabianice, Poland)
 Pashkan (from Paşcani, Romania)
 Piasetzne (from Piaseczno, Poland)
 Pietrokov (from Piotrków Trybunalski, Poland)
 Pilts (from Pilica, Poland)
 Pilzno (named for Pilzno, Poland)
 Pintchiv (from Pińczów, Poland)
 Pittsburgh (from Pittsburgh, Pennsylvania)
 Porisov (from Parysów, Poland)
 Premishlan (from Peremyshliany, Ukraine)
 Pshemishl (from Przemyśl, Poland)
 Pshevorsk (from Przeworsk, Poland)

R 
 Radomsk (from Radomsko, Poland)
 Radoshitz (from Radoszyce, Poland)
 Radvil (from Radyvyliv, Ukraine)
 Radzymin (from Radzymin, Poland)
 Ratzfert (from Újfehértó, Hungary)
 Ribatitch (from Rybotycze, Poland)
 Rimenov (from Rymanów, Poland)
 Roman (from Roman, Romania)
 Ropshitz (from Ropczyce, Poland)
 Ruzhin (from Ruzhyn, Ukraine)
 Rzeszów (Rzeszów, Galicia, Poland)

S 
 Sambur (from Sambir, Ukraine) (several)
 Sasregen (from Szászrégen, Hungary) (today Reghin, Romania)
 Sassov (from Sasiv, Ukraine)
 Savran (from Savran, Ukraine)
 Seret (from Siret, Romania)
 Shedlitz (from Siedlce, Poland)
 Shotz (from Suceava, Romania)
 Shidlovtza (from Szydłowiec, Poland)
 Shineva (from Sieniawa, Poland)
 Shpikov (from Shpykiv, Ukraine)
 Shtefanesht (from Ştefăneşti, Romania)
 Siget (from Máramarossziget, Hungary) (today Sighetu-Marmaţiei, Romania) (parent of, now sharing leadership with, the Satmar dynasty above)
 Sochatchov (from Sochaczew, Poland)
 Sokolov (from Sokołów Podlaski, Poland – there was a branch of the Ropshitz dynasty in Sokołów Małopolski, Poland, as well)
 Stanislov (from Stanyslaviv, Ukraine) (several)
 Stepan (from Stepan, Ukraine)
 Stitshin (from Szczucin, Poland)
 Stretin (from Stratin, Ukraine)
 Strikov (from Stryków, Poland)
 Strizhov (from Strzyżów, Poland)
 Stropkov (from Sztropkó, Hungary (now in Stropkov, Slovakia))
 Sudilkov (from Sudylkiv, Ukraine)
 Sulitza (from Suliţa, Romania) (there was also a branch of the Shotz dynasty in Sulitza)

T 
 Tetsh (from Técső, Hungary (now Tyachiv), Ukraine)
 Temeshvar (from Temesvár, Hungary) (today Timișoara, Romania)
 Tolna (from Talne, Ukraine)
 Toldos Tzvi
 Trisk (from Turiisk, Ukraine)
 Tseshenov (from Cieszanów, Poland)
 Tshakova (from Szczakowa, Poland)

U 
 Ujhel (from Újhely, Hungary)
 Ungvar (from Ungvár, Hungary)
 Ushpitzin (from Oświęcim, Poland)

V 
 Vasloi (from Vaslui, Romania)
 Vien (from Wien/Vienna)
 Volova (from Mizhhirya, Ukraine)
 Vorka from Warka, Poland
 Vulkan (from Zsilyvajdejvulkán, Hungary (today Vulcan, Hunedoara, Romania)

Y 
 Yeruslav (from Jarosław, Poland) (several)

Z 
 Zablitov (from Zabolotiv, Ukraine)
 Zbarz (from Zbarazh, Ukraine) (several)
 Zenta (break-off from Satmar) (from Zenta, Hungary) (today Senta, Serbia)
 Zhmigrod (from Nowy Żmigród, Poland)
 Zhitomir (from Zhytomyr, Ukraine)
 Zidichov (from Zhydachiv, Ukraine)
 Zinkov
 Zlatipol (from Zlatopol)
 Zlotchov (from Zolochiv)
 Zolozitz (from Zaliztsi)
 Zychlin

Hasidic groups (non-dynastic)

References 
 Rabinowicz, Tzvi M. The Encyclopedia of Hasidism  Jason Aronson, Inc., 1996.
 Alfasi, Yitschak. החסידות מדור לדור    Hachasidut miDor leDor   (2 vols)

 
Jewish families
Jewish organizations
Lists of dynasties